The Turkish Abductions were a series of slave raids by pirates from Northwest Africa that took place in Iceland in the summer of 1627.

The pirates came from the cities of Algiers and Salé. 
They raided Grindavík, the East Fjords, and Vestmannaeyjar. About 50 people were killed and close to 400 captured and sold into slavery. A ransom was eventually paid, 9 to 18 years later, for the return of 50 individuals.  

The label "Turkish" does not refer to Turkey; at the time it was a general term for all Muslims in the Mediterranean region since the majority were a part of the Ottoman Empire. During the 17th century, the majority of those called "Turks" in Algeria, were European Christians that had converted to Islam.

Raids 
The Barbary pirates came to Iceland in two groups: the first group was from Salé and the second one, which came a month later, was from Algiers.

The commander of the group from Salé was a Dutchman known as Murat Reis, who had himself turned to piracy after being taken captive by pirates.

Grindavík 
The group from Salé raided the fishing village of Grindavík on 20 June 1627. They captured between 12 and 15 Icelanders and a similar number of Danish and Dutch sailors. Two people from Grindavík died. They captured two ships and looted a third one.

The ships then sailed to Bessastaðir (home of the Danish-Norwegian governor of Iceland) to raid but were unable to make a landing. It is said they were thwarted by cannon fire from the local fortifications (Bessastaðaskans) and a quickly mustered group of lancers from the Southern Peninsula. 

They then sailed home and sold their captives at the slave market of Salé.

East Fjords
The second group of raiders, the ones from Algiers, looted in the East Fjords from 5–13 July 1627. They captured a Danish merchant ship and sank it. 

They additionally took livestock, silver and other goods. 

North of Fáskrúðsfjörður, they hit strong winds and decided to turn around and sail along the south coast of Iceland. 

Around that time, another pirate ship joined them, and they also captured an English fishing vessel.

Vestmannaeyjar 
As there were no harbors or landing sites along the south coast, the three ships eventually came on 16 July to Vestmannaeyjar, a group of islands off the coast. 

They raided the village and Heimaey for three days, capturing 234 people and killing 34, including one of the ministers of the island. 

Those offering resistance were killed, as were some of the old and infirm people. The market houses and the church were burned down. 

On 19 July, the ships left Vestmannaeyjar and sailed back to Algiers.

Life in the Barbary 

Upon reaching Algiers, the captives were placed in a prison, where " ... crowds of people came to see us, for to them we were a rare type of people. Many of the heathen women there, both black and white, had pity on us, shaking their heads and shedding tears. Some of them gave the children bread; some gave small coins."

Then, the commander of the city state selected several individuals for himself, the rest were sold on the slave market.

Many died of illnesses after reaching Africa. 

Close to 100 individuals converted to Islam, mostly younger people. Eight years later there were 70 documented Icelanders who were still Christian.

A few letters written by captives reached Iceland. Guttormur Hallsson, a captive from Eastern Region, said in a letter written in Barbary in 1631: "There is a great difference here between masters. Some captive slaves get good, gentle, or in-between masters, but some unfortunates find themselves with savage, cruel, hardhearted tyrants, who never stop treating them badly, and who force them to labour and toil with scanty clothing and little food, bound in iron fetters, from morning till night."

Return 

Ólafur Egilsson, a minister from Vestmannaeyjar, was set free in Algiers so that he could go and raise money to pay the ransom. He eventually made it to Copenhagen. The fundraising was slow.

On two occasions, those carrying the ransom to Algiers betrayed the captives, and used the money to purchase goods that they traded back in Europe. A letter describes the pain: 
"... to know that those who have been here twice to Algiers with our ransom money have used it instead for trade, to make profit for themselves, and have stolen our liberty, for they never admitted that they could free anyone, or even that they were here to do so. Instead, they told us to petition our gracious master the King, in the name of God, for our freedom, and then they filled simple minded, poor fellows with fair words and went on their way, one with hides, another with chests of sugar, leaving behind them only the smoke of their lying words".

The first major ransom was paid nine years after the abductions when 34 Icelanders were brought from Algiers. Six died on the way back, one was left behind in Glückstadt. A few others had made it back using other methods. In 1645, a ransom was paid for an additional 8 people, who made it back to Copenhagen. In total, 50 individuals got their freedom, but not all returned to Iceland.

The most notable captive was Guðríður Símonardóttir. She returned to Iceland and later married Hallgrímur Pétursson, one of Iceland's most famous poets.

Legacy 
In Iceland, the Turkish Abductions are viewed as a major event and one that is still often discussed, but outside of Iceland the event is practically unknown. Multiple detailed works were written about the event at the time, a major one was Ólafur Egilsson's narrative (en: Ólafur Egilsson's travelogue). It was translated and published in English in 2008. The abductions were viewed at the time as a punishment from God for Iceland's "sinful" lifestyle. They are the only armed expedition against Iceland in modern times that has resulted in any casualties.

Primary sources
 Tyrkjaránið á Íslandi, 1627, Sögurit, 4 (Reykjavík: Sögufélag, 1906–9)
 The Travels of Reverend Ólafur Egilsson (Reisubók Séra Ólafs Egilssonar): The story of the Barbary corsair raid on Iceland in 1627 , trans. by Karl Smári Hreinsson and Adam Nichols (The Catholic University of America Press, 2016),

See also
 Slave raid of Suðuroy
 Sack of Baltimore
 Barbary slave trade
 Slavery in the Ottoman Empire
 Sklavenkasse

References

 
1627 in Europe
1627 in Africa
Piracy
Barbary slave trade
Kidnappings in Iceland
Massacres in Iceland
1620s in the Ottoman Empire
Looting
Slavery in the Ottoman Empire